The 2022 Lower Saxony state election was held on 9 October 2022 to elect the 19th Landtag of Lower Saxony. The incumbent government was a coalition of the Social Democratic Party of Germany (SPD) and Christian Democratic Union of Germany (CDU) led by Minister-President Stephan Weil.

The SPD remained the largest party with 33% and gained two seats, despite a decline of 3.5 percentage points. The CDU suffered a larger loss and won 28%. Alliance 90/The Greens recorded their best result to date in the state, taking 14.5% on a swing of six points. Alternative for Germany (AfD) made gains for the first time in any election since October 2019, improving to 11%, while the Free Democratic Party (FDP) fell just short of the 5% electoral threshold and lost representation. 

Amidst an ongoing energy crisis and looming recession, commentators described the result as a victory for the incumbent federal SPD government of Olaf Scholz, who had suffered a decline in popularity and recent losses in other state elections.

Minister-President Weil ruled out continuing government with the CDU and formed a new coalition with the Greens. He was re-elected as Minister-President by the Landtag on 8 November, and his cabinet was sworn in the same day.

Background
Following the 2017 Lower Saxony state election, the incumbent red-green coalition government of minister-president Stephan Weil was 2 seats short of a majority in the Landtag. Due to FDP leader Stefan Birkner ruling out any coalition with SPD or Greens, and the Greens ruling out any coalition with CDU and FDP, the only option for a majority government was a grand coalition of SPD and CDU, considering no party wanted to form a coalition with the AfD.

On 22 November 2017, Weil was reelected as minister-president receiving 104 out of 137 votes as the head of a grand coalition.

Electoral system
The Landtag of Lower Saxony is elected using mixed-member proportional representation. Its minimum size is 135 seats. Of these, 87 are elected in single-member constituencies, and the remainder are determined by party lists. Voters have two votes: the "first vote" for candidates within each individual constituency, and the "second vote" for party lists. There is an electoral threshold of 5% of second vote to qualify for seats. Seats are allocated using the d'Hondt method, with additional overhang and leveling seats provided to ensure proportionality. The normal term of the Landtag is 5 years.

Parties
The table below lists parties represented in the 18th Landtag of Lower Saxony.

Opinion polling

Graphical summary

Party polling

Minister-President polling

Party competences

Results

Government formation 
Having ruled out cooperation with the AfD, the SPD was able to form a majority government with either the CDU or Greens. The CDU had hoped to pursue a three-party coalition with the Greens and FDP, but after it became clear that the latter had fallen out of the Landtag, this was no longer possible. Minister-President Weil indicated a strong preference for a coalition with the Greens, which they reciprocated. Four days after the election on 13 October, the SPD and Greens agreed to preliminary discussions, with the goal of finalising government negotiations by 3 November. Formal coalition talks began on schedule on 26 October. Both parties avoided leaking information about the proceedings, and insisted that distribution of ministries would be dealt with after matters of policy had been settled. Nonetheless, both favoured greater investment in housing, education, and renewable energy. On the other hand, areas such as transport, climate targets, natural gas production, and police were flagged as potential difficulties.

The SPD and Greens announced just a few days later, on 31 October, that negotiations had concluded successfully. The coalition pact was approved by both parties and signed on 7 November. It included plans for a six billion euro relief package to fight the ongoing energy crisis. The new government also agreed to raise starting salaries for teachers, establish a state housing company geared toward construction of affordable housing, and introduce a statewide 29-euro transit ticket for students, trainees, and volunteers.

Stephan Weil was re-elected as Minister-President by the Landtag on 8 November, winning 82 votes out of 145 cast. Given that the governing coalition held 81 seats, this indicated support from at least one opposition deputy. The third Weil cabinet was sworn in the same day, comprising six SPD ministers and four Greens.

References 

2022 elections in Germany
Elections in Lower Saxony